Kata or Katay was a Georgian royal princess (batonishvili) of the Bagrationi dynasty.

Daughter of King George I of Georgia. She was a wife of Abbas I of Kars (984—1029).

References

Bagrationi dynasty of the Kingdom of Georgia
Princesses from Georgia (country)
11th-century births
Year of death missing